Taneesha Weerakoon (born 15 October 1996) is a Sri Lankan cricketer. He made his first-class debut for Bloomfield Cricket and Athletic Club in the 2016–17 Premier League Tournament on 9 December 2016. He made his List A debut for Anuradhaura District in the 2016–17 Districts One Day Tournament on 22 March 2017.

References

External links
 

1996 births
Living people
Sri Lankan cricketers
Anuradhaura District cricketers
Bloomfield Cricket and Athletic Club cricketers
Cricketers from Colombo